Tess is a feminine given name, typically a diminutive form of Theresa or Tessa.

People 
 Tess Amorim (born 1994), Brazilian actress
 Tess Broussard (born 1972), American model and actress
 Tess Daly (born 1969), British television presenter
 Tess Frazer, American actress
 Tess Gaerthé (born 1991), Dutch singer
 Tess Gallagher (born 1943), American writer
 Tess Gardella (1894-1950), American actress and vaudeville performer
 Tess Gerritsen (born 1953), American novelist
 Tess Harper (born 1950), American actress
 Tess Haubrich (born 1990), Australian actress
 Tess Henley (born 1987), American singer-songwriter
 Tess Holliday (born 1985), American model and blogger
 Tess Jaray (born 1937), British painter and printmaker
 Tess Kingham (born 1963), British politician and one-term Member of Parliament
 Tess Lambe, Irish vaccine development scientist
 Tess Ledeux (born 2001), French freestyle skier
 Tess Mattisson (born 1978), Swedish singer
 Tess Merkel (born 1970), Swedish singer
 Tess Oliveira (born 1987), Brazilian water polo goalkeeper
 Tess Rafferty, American writer, comedian, and actress
 Tess Rothschild (1915-1996), British counter-intelligence officer and magistrate
 Tess Taylor (born 1972), American poet, academic, and CNN contributor
 Tess Wiley (born 1974), American singer-songwriter

Fictional characters

Film 
Tess Skeffington, in Murder By Death, played by Eileen Brennan
 Tess Carlisle, in Guarding Tess, played by Shirley MacLaine
 Tess Carroll, in Charlie St. Cloud, played by Amanda Crew
 Tess Coleman, in Freaky Friday, played by Jamie Lee Curtis
 Tess Durbeyfield/D'Urberville, in Tess, based on Thomas Hardy's novel, played by Nastassja Kinski
 Tess Finnegan, in Fool's Gold (2008), played by Kate Hudson
 Tess Harding, in Woman of the Year, played by Katharine Hepburn
 Tess McGill, in Working Girl, played by Melanie Griffith
 Tess Nichols, in 27 Dresses, played by Malin Åkerman
 Tess Ocean, in Ocean's Eleven (2001) and the sequel Ocean's Twelve, played by Julia Roberts
 Tess Tyler, in the television movie Camp Rock and Billboard Dad, played by Meaghan Jette Martin
 Tess Scali, in Burlesque, played by Cher

Television 
 Tess Adamson, on the New Zealand soap opera Shortland Street
 Tess Bateman, on the British medical drama Casualty, played by Suzanne Packer
 Teresa Bell, on the Australian soap opera Neighbours
 Tess Doerner, on the American science fiction series The 4400, played by Summer Glau
 Tess Fontana, on the American series Eureka
 Tess Foster, protagonist of the Canadian sitcom Life with Boys
 Tess Harding, on the series Roswell, played by Emilie de Ravin
 Tess Silverman McLeod, on the Australian series McLeod's Daughters, played by Bridie Carter
 Tess Mercer, on the American series Smallville
 Tess Ramsey, on the American soap opera Port Charles, played by Kelly Monaco
 Tess Smith, an alternate personality of the character Jessica Buchanan on the American soap opera One Life to Live, played by Bree Williamson
 Tess, on the television series Touched by an Angel, played by Della Reese

Books and comics 
 Tess Durbeyfield/D'Urberville, in the novel Tess of the D'Urbervilles by Thomas Hardy
 Tess Clark, in Chuck Palahniuk's novel Haunted
 Tess Trueheart, in the Dick Tracy comic strip series

Video games 
 Theresa "Tess" Servopoulos, in the game The Last of Us
 Tess Wintory, in the game Test Drive Unlimited 2
 Tess Everis, in the game Destiny (video game)
 Tess Greymane, in the game World of Warcraft

See also
 Tess (disambiguation)

Feminine given names